R v Paul Chambers (appealed to the High Court as Chambers v Director of Public Prosecutions), popularly known as the Twitter Joke Trial, was a United Kingdom legal case centred on the conviction of a man under the Communications Act 2003 for posting a joke about destroying an airport to Twitter, a message which police regarded as "menacing". The conviction in the Magistrates' court was widely condemned as a miscarriage of justice, but was upheld on appeal to the Crown Court. Chambers appealed against the Crown Court decision to the High Court, which ultimately quashed the conviction.

Background 
During late December 2009 and early January 2010, cold weather had resulted in considerable disruption across northern England. Robin Hood Airport in South Yorkshire was one of many airports which was forced to cancel flights.  On 6 January 2010, an intending traveller, Paul Chambers, then aged 26, who was planning to fly to Northern Ireland to meet his then girlfriend (later wife), posted a message on Twitter:

A week later, an off-duty manager at the airport found the message while doing an unrelated computer search. The airport management considered the message to be "not credible" as a threat, but contacted the police anyway. Chambers was arrested by anti-terror police at his office, his house was searched and his mobile phone, laptop and desktop hard drive were confiscated. He was later charged with "sending a public electronic message that was grossly offensive or of an indecent, obscene or menacing character contrary to the Communications Act 2003". On 10 May, he was found guilty at Doncaster Magistrates' Court, fined £385 and ordered to pay £600 costs. As a consequence he lost his job as an administrative and financial supervisor at a car parts company.

Response 
A number of legal commentators and celebrities criticised the conviction and called for it to be overturned. They include journalist Nick Cohen, who drew comparison with Milan Kundera's anti-communist novel The Joke; television writer Graham Linehan; and the comedian and television presenter Stephen Fry, who offered to pay Chambers's fine and subsequent legal bills.

Appeals 
Chambers lost an appeal against his conviction. Judge Jacqueline Davies, sitting with two magistrates, heard his appeal in Doncaster Crown Court; she judged that the tweet contained "menace" and that Chambers must have known that it might be taken seriously. Thousands of Twitter users responded by reposting Chambers' Tweet including the hashtag #iamspartacus, in reference to the climactic "I am Spartacus!" scene in the 1960 film Spartacus.

A further appeal to the High Court was heard on 8 February 2012, in which the two judge panel of Lord Justice Gross and Mr Justice Irwin failed to reach a decision after initially reserving judgement. The appeal by case stated was made by Chambers' barristers, Ben Emmerson QC and Sarah Przybylska; David Allen Green, who acted for Chambers in earlier proceedings, also acted as his solicitor, through Preiskel & Co LLP. The appeal was entirely on points of law and centred on the correct interpretation of section 127(1) of the Communications Act 2003.

A second High Court appeal, before a panel of three judges, headed by the Lord Chief Justice Lord Judge, opened on 22 June 2012. One of the arguments made by Chambers' barrister for this last appeal, John Cooper QC, was that if the tweet was "menacing" so was John Betjeman's poem, "Slough", pleading "Come, friendly bombs, and fall on Slough!". He also asked whether Shakespeare would have been prosecuted if he had tweeted his line from Henry VI, Part 2 (Act IV, Scene 2), "The first thing we do, let's kill all the lawyers". The latter reportedly drew laughter from the judges. On 27 June, the judges announced a reserved judgement. Chambers arrived at court accompanied by Stephen Fry and the comedian Al Murray.

Chambers's conviction was quashed on 27 July 2012. The approved judgement concluded that "a message which does not create fear or apprehension in those to whom it is communicated, or who may reasonably be expected to see it, falls outside this provision [of the 2003 Act]". Accordingly, the appeal against conviction was "allowed on the basis that this 'tweet' did not constitute or include a message of a menacing character".

It has been claimed by sources talking to The Guardian that staff at the Crown Prosecution Service had been in favour of dropping the case, to the point of informing Chambers, via his solicitor, that they would not oppose the final appeal, but had then been overruled by the head of the service, the Director of Public Prosecutions, Keir Starmer. Chambers' MP, Louise Mensch, called for a House of Commons committee to investigate Starmer's behaviour. However, a spokesperson for the CPS said that Starmer had not taken part in decisions about the case.

Impact of the case
The case led to a review of the guidance for the Crown Prosecution Service of their use of Section 127 and other speech related offences for online content, which attempted to narrow the use of the section in prosecutions. The "grossly offensive" test has remained controversial and has been further reviewed by the Law Commission, which is examining current offences to "improve the protection afforded to victims" while providing "better safeguards for freedom of expression".

See also 
 Horizon Group v. Bonnen
 Mark Meechan

References

External links 
 Crown Prosecution Files on the case, released under Freedom of Information law.

Paul Chambers
Twitter controversies
2012 in British law
2010 in England
2011 in England
2012 in England
United Kingdom free speech case law
Stephen Fry
Overturned convictions in England